Ryan Alan Lasch (born January 22, 1987) is an American professional ice hockey winger for Frölunda HC of the Swedish Hockey League (SHL).

Playing career
After playing four years with St. Cloud State University, Lasch completed his collegiate career as the University's all-time leading scorer. An Undrafted Free Agent, Lasch began his professional career in Europe, signing a one-year contract with Södertälje SK of the Swedish Elitserien. During the following 2011–12 season he led the Finnish SM-Liiga with 62 points to capture the scoring title whilst helping the Lahti Pelicans to finish second, their highest in franchise history.

Despite re-signing to a one-year contract extension with the Pelicans, on May 31, 2012, Lasch was signed by the Anaheim Ducks to a two-year contract prior to the 2012–13 season. In signing he became the franchise's first Orange County–born player to sign with the Ducks. Due to the lockout he was directly assigned to the Ducks AHL affiliate, the Norfolk Admirals.

Unable to duplicate his European success with the Admirals, and also enduring a stint with ECHL club the Fort Wayne Komets, Lasch opted to return to the Swedish Elitserien, signing on loan from the Ducks to the Växjö Lakers for the remainder of the season on January 26, 2013. After playing in the Lakers last 10 games to end their season, the Ducks traded Lasch along with a seventh round pick in 2014 to the Toronto Maple Leafs in exchange for Dave Steckel on March 15, 2013. He was then immediately recalled to report to AHL affiliate, the Toronto Marlies.

Lasch then spent the 2013-14 season entirely with the Växjö Lakers, tallying 20 goals and 16 assists in 54 SHL games. The 2014-15 season saw him move to Finland. He made 43 Liiga appearances for HC TPS, before returning to Sweden. He finished the season with Frölunda HC, scoring six goals in 12 contests to go along with eight assists.

Lasch re-signed with Frölunda for the 2015-16 campaign and won the Swedish national championship as well as the Champions Hockey League (CHL) with the team. He led the SHL in assists (51 in regular season) and also scored 15 goals. In 16 playoff contests, Lasch tallied eight goals and eleven assists. In CHL play, Lasch scored seven goals and dished out nine assists in 13 games and was named Champions Hockey League Most Valuable Player.

On September 8, 2016, Lasch was signed to a one-year contract by SC Bern as a replacement for Kris Versteeg. He saw the ice in 52 contests with 17 goals and 34 assists en route to winning the 2017 Swiss championship. On April 21, he signed a three-year deal with Frölunda HC, returning for a second stint with the SHL outfit.

He returned to Lahti Pelicans for the 2020-21 season.

On January 23, 2021, Lasch joined the ZSC Lions as a replacement for injured Chris Baltisberger for the remainder of the 2020-21 season.

On May 19, 2021, Lasch returned to Frölunda.

Playing style 
Matias Strozyk, a journalist for Yleisradio, described Ryan Lasch's playing style for Elite Prospects in 2011:

A fairly small winger and hard worker. A quick skater with sharp movement. Has a very good shot and does well in playmaking. Useful as an offensive player, especially as a finisher. Sometimes criticized of embellishment when drawing penalties.

Career statistics

Regular season and playoffs

International

Awards and honors

References

External links
 

1987 births
Living people
AHCA Division I men's ice hockey All-Americans
American men's ice hockey right wingers
SC Bern players
Fort Wayne Komets players
Frölunda HC players
Ice hockey players from California
Lahti Pelicans players
Norfolk Admirals players
Södertälje SK players
Sportspeople from Lake Forest, California
St. Cloud State Huskies men's ice hockey players
Toronto Marlies players
HC TPS players
Växjö Lakers players
ZSC Lions players